Parbhuwala is a large village in Hisar district, Haryana, India. This village has total 1246 families residing. Parbhuwala has population of 6386 as per government records.

Administration
Prabhuwala village is administrated by Sarpanch through its Gram Panchayat, who is elected representative of village as per constitution of India and Panchyati Raj Act.

Notable persons
 Relu Ram Punia, former MLA Barwala
 Chaudhary Dalbir Singh, former Member of Parliament 
 Kumari Selja, former Cabinet Minister

References 

Villages in Hisar district